Jump for Joy is  an album by jazz singer Peggy Lee that was released in 1958 and arranged and conducted by Nelson Riddle.

Track listing
"Jump for Joy" (Duke Ellington, Sid Kuller, Paul Francis Webster) - 2:07
"Back in Your Own Backyard" (Dave Dreyer, Al Jolson, Billy Rose) - 2:26
"When My Sugar Walks Down the Street" (Gene Austin, Jimmy McHugh, Irving Mills) - 1:58
"I Hear Music" (Burton Lane, Frank Loesser) - 2:07
"Just in Time" (Betty Comden, Adolph Green, Jule Styne) - 2:50
"Old Devil Moon" (Yip Harburg, Burton Lane) - 2:58
"What a Little Moonlight Can Do" (Harry M. Woods) - 2:41
"Four or Five Times" (Byron Gay, Marco H. Hellman) - 2:33
"Music! Music! Music!" (Bernie Baum, Stephen Weiss) - 2:30
"Cheek to Cheek" (Irving Berlin) - 2:37
"Glory of Love" (Billy Hill) - 2:37
"Ain't We Got Fun?" (Richard A. Whiting, Gus Kahn, Raymond B. Egan) - 2:12

Personnel
Peggy Lee – vocals

References

1958 albums
Peggy Lee albums
Capitol Records albums
Albums arranged by Nelson Riddle